Sick Textile Undertakings (Nationalization) Act 1974 is  the law enacted by parliament of India in December 1974  to acquire sick textile units, reorganise and rehabilitate them to "subserve the interests of the general public by the augmentation of the production and distribution, at fair prices, of different varieties of cloth and yarn".

Under the Act, 103 sick textile mills were nationalised and transferred to the National Textile Corporation (NTC). The mill owners were paid  Rs. 34.75 crore as total compensation.  

The Act was amended in 1995 to allow NTC to transfer, mortgage or dispose of land, plant, machinery or other assets "for the better management, modernisation, restructuring and revival of sick undertakings". After this amendment NTPC sold land  to develop commercial and residential buildings in Lower Parel and other areas in Mumbai.

References

Textile industry in Maharashtra
1974 in law
Acts of the Parliament of India 1974
History of the textile industry in India